Something Special is the fifth album by the Los Angeles, California-based R&B group the Sylvers.

Reception

Released in November, 1976, this was the family's second album for Capitol Records, and their fifth album overall.  Produced by Freddie Perren, "Something Special" would be the last album in which the Sylvers would team with the veteran producer.

Two singles were released from this set: "Hot Line" peaked at #5, and  "High School Dance" peaked at #17.

Track listing
 All songs written by Freddie Perren and Kenneth St. Lewis, except where noted.

"Hot Line" (4:32)
"Got to Have You (For My Very Own)" (Leon Sylvers III, Ricky Sylvers) (4:16)
"Now I Want You" (2:46)
"Ain't No Doubt About It" (3:55)
"Shake 'Um Up" (2:59)
"Mista Guitar Man" (5:00) 
"Lovin' You Is Like Lovin' the Wind" (3:12)
"High School Dance"  (Edmund Sylvers, James Sylvers, Leon Sylvers III, Ricky Sylvers) (3:49)
"That's What Love Is Made Of" (Leon Sylvers III) (3:19)
"Disco Showdown" (Leon Sylvers III, James Sylvers) (2:53)

Personnel
Freddie Perren - producer, writer 
Larkin Arnold - executive producer
Kenneth St. Lewis - writer
Chuck Rainey - bass
 Leon Sylvers III - bass, writer
 Scott Edwards - bass
James Gadson - drums 
 Mike Brown – drums
Robert Bowles - guitar
Frank Wire - guitar
Ricky Sylvers – guitar, writer
Greg Bryant - keyboards
 John Barnes - keyboards
Sylvester Rivers – keyboards
Bob Zimitti - percussion
Bradie Speller – percussion
Larry Miles - recording engineer, mixing
George Blair - assistant engineer
George Belle - assistant engineer
Roy Kohara - art direction
Raul Vega - photography

Charts

Singles

References

External links
 The Sylvers – Something Special at Discogs

1976 albums
The Sylvers albums
Capitol Records albums
Albums recorded at Total Experience Recording Studios
Albums produced by Freddie Perren